Sheep's Green Bridge is a footbridge over the River Cam in Cambridge, England. It is the second bridge on the river as it flows into Cambridge. It connects Coe Fen near Sheep's Green and Lammas Land. 
The bridge was opened in 1910 to replace the chain ferry taking ladies over to the bathing place on Sheep's Green. After deterioration in the bridge's condition
it was reconstructed in 2006, the decking was relaid and the steps were replaced with ramps.

See also
List of bridges in Cambridge
Template:River Cam map

References

Bridges in Cambridge
Bridges across the River Cam
Bridges completed in 2006
Pedestrian bridges in England
Wooden bridges in the United Kingdom
Beam bridges in England